The University of Massachusetts Online is an online website which users can use to earn a degree from the University of Massachusetts. It is targeted at the demographic of those who have families or who are unable to attend a college because of the pressing need of a job.

External links
http://www.umassonline.net/

O
Distance education institutions based in the United States